Danya M. Alhamrani (born c. 1975) is a managing partner in the Saudi company Eggdancer Productions. She is most notable in the West for getting her hometown of Jeddah, Saudi Arabia selected for the "FAN-atic" episode of Anthony Bourdain: No Reservations.

Alhamrani, along with her partner Dania Nassief, are the first women in Saudi Arabia allowed to own and manage a company without a male business partner. Alhamrani has an MA in TV and Film Production from San Diego State University, and worked on the Emmy Award winning television series The Short List.

References

External links
  (official website)
 

1970s births
Living people
Year of birth uncertain
People from Jeddah
Saudi Arabian film producers
Saudi Arabian television producers